The Gold Bauhinia Star (GBS) is the highest Bauhinia Star rank in the honours system of Hong Kong, created in 1997 to replace the British honours system of the Order of the British Empire after the transfer of sovereignty to People's Republic of China and the establishment of the Hong Kong Special Administrative Region (HKSAR). It is awarded to those who have given distinguished service to the community or rendered public or voluntary services of a very high degree of merit.

List of recipients

1998 
 Mr. WONG Wing-ping, Joseph, G.B.S., J.P.
 Mr. WOO Kwong-ching, Peter, G.B.S., J.P.
 The Honourable Mrs. FAN HSU Lai-tai, Rita, G.B.S., J.P.
 Mr. John Estmond STRICKLAND, G.B.S., J.P.
 Dr. HU Hung-lick, Henry, G.B.S., J.P.
 Mr. HUI Si-yan, Rafael, G.B.S., J.P.(Revoked in 2018)
 Mr. Raymond CHOW, G.B.S.
 The Honourable LAU Wong-fat, G.B.S., J.P.
 Dr. CHENG Hon-kwan, G.B.S., J.P.
 Dr. TSE Chi-wai, Daniel, G.B.S., J.P.
 Mr. KWONG Ki-chi, G.B.S., J.P.
 Mr. LO Hong-sui, Vincent, G.B.S.
 Miss TAM Wai-chu, Maria, G.B.S., J.P.

1999 
 The Honourable Mrs. FONG WONG Kut-man, Nellie, G.B.S., J.P.
 Mr. LEE Tung-hai, Leo, G.B.S., J.P.
 Mr. TANG Hsiang-chien, Leo, G.B.S., J.P.
 Mr. SUEN Ming-yeung, Michael, G.B.S., J.P.
 The Honourable Mr. Justice John Barry MORTIMER, G.B.S.
 The Honourable LEUNG Chun-ying, G.B.S., J.P.
 The Honourable LEUNG Kam-chung, Antony, G.B.S., J.P.
 Mr. CHAN Cho Chak, John, G.B.S., J.P.
 Mr. WONG Hong-yuen, Peter, G.B.S., J.P.
 Mr. WONG Kin-lap, G.B.S.
 The Honourable Mr. Justice LIU Tsz-ming, Benjamin, G.B.S.
 Dr. the Honourable CH'IEN Kuo-fung, Raymond, G.B.S., J.P.
 Mrs. FOK LO Shiu-ching, Katherine, G.B.S., J.P.
 The Honourable Mr. Justice Noel Plunkett POWER, G.B.S.
 Mr. KWONG Hon-sang, G.B.S., J.P.
 The Honourable TAM Yiu-chung, G.B.S., J.P.
 Mr. Ian George McCurdy WINGFIELD, G.B.S., J.P.

2000 
 The Honourable LEE Yeh-kwong, Charles, G.B.S., J.P.
 The Honourable TANG Ying-yen, Henry, G.B.S., J.P.
 The Honourable CHUNG, Shui-ming, G.B.S., J.P.
 Mr. WONG Shing-wah, Dominic, G.B.S., OBE, J.P.
 Mr. LAM Woon-kwong, G.B.S., J.P.
 Mr. LAN Hong-tsung, David, G.B.S., J.P.
 The Honourable Mr. Justice Gerald Paul NAZARETH, G.B.S., J.P.
 Professor LI Kwok-cheung, Arthur, G.B.S., J.P.
 Professor WOO Chia-wei, CBE, G.B.S., J.P.,
 Dr. Hari Naroomal HARILELA, G.B.S., J.P.
 Dr. LEE Hon-chiu, G.B.S., J.P.
 Mr. LEUNG Nai-pang, G.B.S., J.P.
 Mr. CHAN Wing-kee, G.B.S., J.P.
 Dr. CHAN Yau-hing, Robin, G.B.S., J.P.
 Dr. LAU Wah-sum, G.B.S., J.P.
 Dr. CHUNG Chi-yung, G.B.S.
 Mr. Peter Dennis Antony SUTCH, G.B.S.

2001 
 Miss YUE Chung-yee, Denise, G.B.S., J.P.
 Mr. IP Shu-kwan, Stephen, G.B.S., J.P.
 The Honourable TIEN Pei-chun, James, G.B.S., J.P.
 Dr. the Honourable David LI Kwok-po, G.B.S., J.P.
 The Honourable LAU Hon-chuen, Ambrose, G.B.S., J.P.
 The Honourable Mr. Justice WONG Kin-chow, Michael, G.B.S.
 Mr. YAM Chi-kwong, Joseph, G.B.S., J.P.
 Mr. George HO, G.B.S., J.P.
 Mr. Ronald Joseph ARCULLI, G.B.S., J.P.
 Dr. TSUI Tsin-tong, G.B.S., J.P.
 Dr. LEONG Che-hung, Edward, G.B.S., J.P.
 Dr. WONG Kin-hang, Philip, G.B.S., J.P.
 Dr. WU Wai-yung, Raymond, G.B.S., J.P.
 Mr. LIU Lit-man, G.B.S., J.P.
 Mr. LO Chung-wing, Victor, G.B.S., J.P.
 Mr. James Kerr FINDLAY, G.B.S.
 Mr. HUI Ki-on, G.B.S.
 Mr. CHENG Kar-shun, Henry, G.B.S.
 Mr. Martin Gilbert BARROW, G.B.S.
 Mr. TSE Sze-wing, Edmund, G.B.S.

2002 
 Mr. CHAU Tak-hay, G.B.S., J.P.
 Mrs. YAM KWAN Pui-ying, Lily, G.B.S., J.P.
 Mrs. IP LAU Suk-yee, Regina, G.B.S., J.P.
 Mr. LEE Shing-see, G.B.S., J.P.
 Mrs. CHOW LIANG Shuk-yee, Selina, G.B.S., J.P.
 The Honourable TSANG Yok-sing, Jasper, G.B.S., J.P.
 Professor CHANG, Hsin-kang, G.B.S., J.P.
 Professor POON Chung-kwong, G.B.S., J.P.
 Professor TAM Sheung-wai, G.B.S., J.P.
 The Honourable Mr. Justice WOO Kwok-hing, G.B.S.
 Mr. Stuart Wreford HARBINSON, G.B.S., J.P.
 Mr. NG Wing-fui, Nicholas, G.B.S., J.P.
 Mr. HU Fa-kuang, G.B.S., J.P.
 Dr. CHAN Sui-kau, G.B.S., J.P.
 Professor YOUNG Tse-tse, Rosie, G.B.S., J.P.
 Dr. CHENG Wai-kin, Edgar, G.B.S., J.P.
 Mr. Gordon SIU, G.B.S., J.P.
 Dr. CHENG CHANG Yung-tsung, Alice, G.B.S.

2003 
 Mr. TSANG Yam-pui, G.B.S.
 The Honourable Mr. Justice LEONG Shiu-chung, Arthur, G.B.S.
 Dr. the Honourable LI Ka-cheung, Eric, G.B.S., J.P.
 Dr. the Honourable WONG Yu-hong, Philip, G.B.S.
 Professor CHEN Kwan-yiu, Edward, G.B.S., J.P.
 Dr. KUNG Ziang-mien, James, G.B.S.
 Mrs. LAW FAN Chiu-fun, Fanny, G.B.S., J.P.
 Mr. LAI Nin, Alan, G.B.S., J.P.
 Mrs. LAM PEI Yu-dja, Peggy, G.B.S., J.P.
 Dr. LAM LEE Kiu-yue, Alice Piera, G.B.S., J.P.
 Dr. HUI Chi-ming, G.B.S., J.P.
 Mr. CHENG Mo-chi, Moses, G.B.S., J.P.
 Dr. LO Ka-shui, G.B.S., J.P.
 The Honourable Michael D. KADOORIE, G.B.S.
 Dr. HO Hung-sun, Stanley, G.B.S.
 Mr. YUAN Geng, G.B.S.
 Mr. Simon Herbert MAYO, G.B.S.
 Dr. FUNG Kwok-king, Victor, G.B.S.
 Mr. FUNG Siu-por, Lawrence, G.B.S.
 Mr. James Edward THOMPSON, G.B.S.

2004 
 The Honourable FOK Tsun-ting, Timothy, G.B.S., J.P.
 The Honourable LAU Kin-yee, Miriam, G.B.S., J.P.
 The Honourable IP Kwok-him, G.B.S., J.P.
 Mr. Haider Hatim Tyebjee BARMA, G.B.S., J.P.
 Dr. CHOW Yei-ching, G.B.S.
 Sir WU Ying-sheung, Gordon, G.B.S.
 Mr. LEUNG Po-wing, Bowen, G.B.S., J.P.
 Mr. FANG Hung, Kenneth, G.B.S., J.P.
 Mr. David Gordon ELDON, G.B.S., J.P.
 Mr. SZE Cho-cheung, Michael, G.B.S., J.P.
 Mr. YUEN Mo, G.B.S., J.P.
 Dr. Allan ZEMAN, G.B.S., J.P.
 Dr. CHOA Wing-sien, George, G.B.S., J.P.
 Mr. CHENG Wai-chee, Christopher, G.B.S., J.P.
 Ms. YIP Wai-jane, G.B.S.

2005 
 The Honourable MA Lik, G.B.S., J.P.
 Professor NG Ching-fai, G.B.S.
 Dr. LUI Che-woo, G.B.S., J.P.
 Dr. YEOH Eng-kiong, G.B.S., J.P.
 Mr. YEUNG Kai-yin, G.B.S., J.P.
 Mr. CHENG Hoi-chuen, Vincent, G.B.S., J.P.
 Mr. Eric Charles BARNES, G.B.S.

2006 
 The Honourable Bernard Charnwut CHAN, G.B.S., J.P.
 Ir. LO Yiu-ching, G.B.S., J.P.
 Mr. CHAU How-chen, G.B.S., J.P.
 Mr. YU Kwok-chun, G.B.S., J.P.
 Ms. LEE Lai-kuen, Shelley, G.B.S., J.P.
 Dr. MONG Man-wai, William, G.B.S.

2007 
 The Honourable CHEUNG Kin-chung, Matthew, G.B.S., J.P.
 The Honourable Mrs.LEUNG LAU Yau-fun, Sophie, G.B.S., SBS, J.P.
 The Most Venerable The Honourable KOK Kwong, G.B.S.
 Mr. HO Sai-chu, G.B.S., SBS, J.P.
 Dr. YU Sun-say, Jose, G.B.S., SBS, J.P.
 Dr. HO Chi-ping, Patrick, G.B.S., J.P.
 Dr. LIAO Sau-tung, Sarah Mary, G.B.S., J.P.
 Mr. LEE Ming-kwai, G.B.S.
 The Most Reverend KWONG Kong-kit, Peter, G.B.S.

2008 
 The Honourable CHENG Yiu-tong, G.B.S., J.P.
 The Honourable LIAO Cheung-sing, Andrew, G.B.S., SC, J.P.
 Dr. the Honourable CHEUNG Kin-tung, Marvin, G.B.S., J.P.
 Mr. FONG Ching, Eddy, G.B.S., J.P.
 Mr. LAM Chung-lun, Billy, G.B.S., J.P.
 Mrs. LEUNG WONG Bei-fong, Sally, G.B.S., J.P.
 Dr. WONG Chi-yun, Allan, G.B.S., J.P.
 Mr. WU Ting-yuk, Anthony, G.B.S., J.P.

2009 
 The Honourable LAM Sui-lung, Stephen, G.B.S., J.P.
 The Honourable LEE Siu-kwong, Ambrose, G.B.S., IDSM, J.P.
 Dr. the Honourable CHOW Yat-ngok, York, G.B.S., J.P.
 The Honourable Mrs. CHA SHIH May-lung, Laura, G.B.S., J.P.
 Professor the Honourable CHEUNG Bing-leung, Anthony, G.B.S., J.P.
 The Honourable CHEUNG Hok-ming, G.B.S., J.P.
 The Honourable Mr. Justice Michael STUART-MOORE, G.B.S.
 Mr. HO Chi-ming, Kevin, G.B.S., J.P.
 Dr. CHOI Chee-ming, Francis, G.B.S., J.P.
 Ms. TAI Yuen-ying, Alice, G.B.S., J.P.
 Dr. WU James Tak, G.B.S.
 Mr. MA Si-hang, Frederick, G.B.S.

2010 
 The Honourable TSANG Tak-sing, G.B.S., J.P.
 The Honourable Mrs LAM CHENG Yuet-ngor, Carrie, G.B.S., J.P.
 The Honourable LEUNG Kwan-yuen, Andrew, G.B.S., J.P.
 Mr. LEE, Kai-ming, G.B.S., J.P.
 Mr. CHOW Man-yiu, Paul, G.B.S., J.P.
 Mr. HUI Chun-fui, Victor, G.B.S., J.P.
 Dr. TAI Tak-fung, G.B.S., J.P.
 Mrs. YAU TSANG Ka-lai, Carrie, G.B.S., J.P.
 Mr. CHEUNG Chun-yuen, Barry, G.B.S., J.P.
 Mr. CHAN Chun-yuen, Thomas, G.B.S., J.P.
 Mr. MAK Chai-kwong, G.B.S., J.P.
 Mr. Albert Jinghan CHENG, G.B.S., J.P.

2011 
 The Honourable YAU Tang-wah, Edward, G.B.S., J.P.
 The Honourable Eva CHENG, G.B.S., J.P.
 Professor the Honourable LAU Juen-yee, Lawrence, G.B.S., J.P.
 The Honourable WU Hung-yuk, Anna, G.B.S., J.P.
 The Honourable LAM Kin-fung, Jeffrey, G.B.S., J.P.
 Professor TSUI Lap-chee, G.B.S., J.P.
 Ms. TING Yuk-chee, Christina, G.B.S., J.P.
 Dr. CHAN Tung, G.B.S., J.P.
 Ms. CHENG Yeuk-wah, Teresa, G.B.S., SC, J.P.
 Miss CHOI Ying-pik, Yvonne, G.B.S., J.P.
 The Honourable Mr. Justice Anthony Gordon ROGERS,  G.B.S., J.P.
 Mr. SO Chak-kwong, Jack, G.B.S., J.P.
 Mr. TANG King-shing, G.B.S., PDSM
 Mr. HUI Wing-mau, G.B.S.
 The Honourable Mrs. Justice Doreen Maria LE PICHON, G.B.S.
 Mrs. LAU NG Wai-lan, Rita, G.B.S.

2012 
 Professor the Honourable CHAN Ka-keung, Ceajer, G.B.S., J.P.
 The Honourable SO Kam-leung, Gregory, G.B.S., J.P.
 The Honourable TAM Chi-yuen, G.B.S., J.P.
 Dr. TONG Hin-ming, Timothy, G.B.S.
 Mr. TANG Kwok-bun, Benjamin, G.B.S., J.P.
 The Honourable Mr. Justice Michael John HARTMANN, G.B.S.
 Mr. CHAN Tak-lam, Norman, G.B.S., J.P.
 Professor Gabriel M. LEUNG, G.B.S., J.P.
 Professor LAU Siu-kai, G.B.S., J.P.
 Mr. CHEN Nan-lok, Philip, G.B.S., J.P.
 Mr. YEUNG Ka-sing, G.B.S., J.P.
 Mr. CHUNG Pui-lam, G.B.S., J.P.
 Mr. HO Suen-wai, Francis, G.B.S., J.P.
 Ms. BIRCH LEE Suk-yee, Sandra, G.B.S., J.P.
 Professor Felice LIEH-MAK, G.B.S., J.P.
 Ir. Ronald James BLAKE, G.B.S., J.P.

2013 
 The Honourable SHEK Lai-him, Abraham, G.B.S., J.P.
 Mr. NG Sze-fuk, George, G.B.S., J.P.
 Mr. LEE Chung-tak, Joseph, G.B.S., J.P.
 Professor LEE Chack-fan, G.B.S., J.P.
 Professor CHOW Wing-sun, Nelson, G.B.S., J.P.
 Ms. YANG Mun-tak, Marjorie, G.B.S., J.P.
 Mr. LEE Cho-jat, G.B.S.
 The Honourable Sir Gerard BRENNAN, G.B.S.
 Ms. CHAN Shuk-leung, G.B.S.

2014 
 The Honourable Mr. Justice Frank STOCK, G.B.S., J.P.
 The Right Honourable the Lord HOFFMANN, G.B.S.
 Miss AU King-chi, G.B.S., J.P.
 Dr. CHAN Chung-bun, Bunny, G.B.S., J.P.
 Ir. Dr. WONG Kwok-keung, G.B.S., J.P.
 Mr. HUNG Chao-hong, Albert, G.B.S., J.P.
 Dr. LAW Chi-kwong, G.B.S., J.P.
 Dr. CHOI Koon-shum, Jonathan, G.B.S., J.P.
 Mr. Duncan Warren PESCOD, G.B.S., J.P.
 Mr. YOUNG Lap-moon, Raymond, G.B.S., J.P.
 Mr. WU Moon-hoi, Marco, G.B.S.

2015 
 The Honourable CHOW Chung-kong, G.B.S., J.P.
 The Right Honourable the Lord MILLETT, G.B.S.
 The Honourable CHEUNG Yu-yan, G.B.S., J.P.
 Mr. WONG Hung-chiu, Raymond, G.B.S., J.P.
 Dr. WONG Ying-wai, Wilfred, G.B.S., J.P.
 Dr. LEE Ka-kit, Peter, G.B.S., J.P.
 Mr. WAI Chi-sing, G.B.S., J.P.
 Mr. LAM Shu-chit, G.B.S.
 Mr. KAN Fook-yee, G.B.S.
 Mr. TSANG Wai-hung, G.B.S., PDSM
 Mr. KOO Joseph, G.B.S.
 The Right Honourable the Lord WOOLF, G.B.S.
 Dr. LAM Kin-ngok, Peter, G.B.S.
 Mr. CHOI Park-lai, G.B.S.

2016 
 The Honourable LAI Tung-kwok, G.B.S., I.D.S.M., J.P. 
 The Honourable WONG Kam-sing, G.B.S., J.P.
 The Honourable CHAN Mo-po, Paul, G.B.S., M.H., J.P.
 The Honourable CHAN Kam-lam, G.B.S., J.P. 
 The Honourable FANG Kang, Vincent, G.B.S., J.P.   
 The Honourable Mr Justice TO Kwai-fung, Anthony, G.B.S.
 Mr. TUNG Chee-chen, G.B.S., J.P.  
 Ms. WONG Sean-yee, Anissa, G.B.S., J.P. 
 Mr. YUEN Ming-fai, Richard, G.B.S., J.P. 
 Miss TAM Kam-lan, Annie, G.B.S., J.P. 
 Ms. KI Man-fung, Leonie, G.B.S., J.P.
 Mr. PANG Yiu-kai, G.B.S., J.P.
 Dr. YEUNG Chun-kam, Charles, G.B.S., J.P. 
 Mr. LIU Changle, G.B.S., J.P. 
 Mr. LO Man-tuen, G.B.S., J.P. 
 Mr. Winfried ENGELBRECHT-BRESGES, G.B.S., J.P. 
 Mr. LAM Kwong-siu, G.B.S.
 Mr. TANG Kwok-wai, Paul, G.B.S., J.P.

2017 
 The Honourable NG Hak-kim, Eddie, G.B.S., J.P.
 Dr. the Honourable KO Wing-man, G.B.S., J.P.
 The Honourable CHEUNG Chi-kong, G.B.S., J.P.
 The Honourable YANG Wei-hsiung, Nicholas, G.B.S., J.P.
 The Honourable CHEUNG Wan-ching, Clement, G.B.S., J.P.
 The Honourable SUI Wai-keung, Stephen, G.B.S., J.P.
 The Honourable MA Siu-cheung, Eric, G.B.S., J.P.
 Mr. SUN Tak-kei, David, G.B.S., J.P.
 The Honourable WONG Ting-kwong, G.B.S., J.P.
 The Honourable CHAN Kin-por, G.B.S., J.P.
 The Honourable Mr. Justice FUNG Wah, Barnabas, G.B.S.
 Mr. LAW Chi-kong, Joshua, G.B.S., J.P.
 Mr. SHIU Sin-por, G.B.S., J.P.
 Miss HO Shuk-yee, Susie, G.B.S., J.P.
 Mr. NG Leung-ho, G.B.S., J.P.
 Professor CHOW Chun-kay, Stephen, G.B.S., J.P.
 Mr. MA Ho-fai, G.B.S., J.P.
 Ms. KAO Ching-chi, Sophia, G.B.S., J.P.
 Mr. LAU Ping-cheung, G.B.S., J.P.
 Dr. LI Sau-hung, Eddy, G.B.S., J.P.
 Dr. WONG Yau-kar, David, G.B.S., J.P.
 Mr. LAU Ming-wai, G.B.S., J.P.
 Mr. CHUNG Chi-ping, Roy, G.B.S., J.P.
 Mr. IP Sik-on, Simon, G.B.S., J.P.
 Ms. LAM Shuk-yee, G.B.S.

2018 
 The Right Honourable the Lord NEUBERGER of Abbotsbury, G.B.S.
 Mr. LIN Sun-mo, Willy, G.B.S., J.P.
 Mr. HON Chi-keung, G.B.S., J.P.
 Mr. FONG Yun-wah, Henry, G.B.S., J.P.
 Mr. Thomas Brian STEVENSON, G.B.S., J.P.
 Professor YUEN Kwok-yung, G.B.S., J.P.
 Mr. Charles Nicholas BROOKE, G.B.S., J.P.
 Mr. CHENG Wai-sun, Edward, G.B.S., J.P.
 Mr. KUNG Lin-cheng, Leo, G.B.S., J.P.
 The Honourable Mr. Justice Michael Victor LUNN, G.B.S.

2019 
 The Honourable LIAO Cheung-kong, Martin, G.B.S., J.P.
 The Right Honourable the Lord WALKER of Gestingthorpe, G.B.S.
 The Most Reverend Dr. KWONG Paul, G.B.S.
 Mr. WONG Ho-yuen, Andrew, G.B.S., J.P.
 Mr. YING Yiu-hong, Stanley, G.B.S., J.P.
 Mrs. LAI CHAN Chi-kuen, Marion, G.B.S., J.P.
 Mr. NG Sau-kei, Wilfred, G.B.S., MH, J.P.
 Mr. TONG Carlson, G.B.S., J.P.
 Professor LEONG Chi-yan, John, G.B.S., J.P.
 Dr. CHEN Cheng-jen, Clement, G.B.S., J.P.
 Mr. CHEUK Wing-hing, G.B.S., J.P.

2020 
 Mr. LO Wai-chung, Stephen, G.B.S., P.D.S.M., J.P.
 The Honourable Mr. Justice Anthony Murray GLEESON, G.B.S.
 The Honourable MA Fung-kwok, G.B.S., J.P.
 Miss LAU Yin-wah, Emma, G.B.S., J.P.
 Ms. TSE Man-yee, Elizabeth, G.B.S., J.P.
 Mr. CHOW Tat-ming, Thomas, G.B.S., J.P.
 Mr. LAI Yee-tak, Joseph, G.B.S., J.P.
 Mr. TONG Chi-keung, Donald, G.B.S., J.P.
 Ms. CHAN Yuen-han, G.B.S., J.P.
 Mr. PANG Cheung-wai, Thomas, G.B.S., J.P.
 Dr. TAM Kam-kau, G.B.S., J.P.
 Mr. WONG Tung-shun, Peter, G.B.S., J.P.
 Mr. LAU, James Henry Jr., G.B.S., J.P.
 Mr. KUNG Chun-lung, G.B.S., J.P.
 Mr. NG Woon-yim, G.B.S., M.H.

2021 

 The Honourable Wong Kwok-kin, G.B.S., J.P.
 Ir. Dr. The Honourable Lo Wai-kwok, G.B.S., M.H., J.P.
 The Honourable Mr. Justice Yeung Chun-kuen, G.B.S.
 The Honourable Mr. Justice Ian Charles McWalters, G.B.S., S.C., J.P.
 Ms. Chang King-yiu, G.B.S., J.P.
 Mrs. Tse Ling Kit-ching, Cherry, G.B.S., J.P.
 Mr. Yung Wai-hung, Philip, G.B.S., J.P.
 Mrs. Fung Ching Suk-yee, Betty, G.B.S., J.P.
 Ms. Cheng Mei-sze, Maisie, G.B.S., J.P.
 Mr. Lam Sai-hung, G.B.S., J.P.
 Ms. Wong Wai-ching, G.B.S., J.P.
 Mr. Yu Pang-chun, G.B.S., J.P.
 Mr. Yau How-boa, Stephen, G.B.S., M.H., J.P.
 Professor Chen Hung-yee, Albert, G.B.S., J.P.
 Mr. Tang Ching-ho, G.B.S., J.P.
 Mr. Lee Ka-shing, Martin, G.B.S., J.P.
 Mr. Yiu Chi-shing, G.B.S., J.P.
 Mr. Ian Grenville Cross, G.B.S., S.C.

2022 

 The Honourable Chan Kwok-ki, Eric, G.B.S., S.B.S., I.D.S.M., J.P.
 The Honourable Wong Wai-lun, Michael, G.B.S., J.P.
 The Honourable Tong Ka-wah, Ronny, G.B.S., S.C., J.P.
 The Honourable Yeung Yun-hung, Kevin, G.B.S., J.P.
 The Honourable Tsang Kwok-wai, Erick, G.B.S., I.D.S.M., J.P.
 The Honourable Hui Ching-yu, Christopher, G.B.S., J.P.
 The Honourable Tang Ping-keung, G.B.S., I.D.S.M., J.P.
 Dr. The Honourable Chan Ching-har, Eliza, G.B.S., S.B.S., J.P.
 Mr. Chan Fan, Frank, G.B.S.
 Professor Chan Siu-chee, Sophia, G.B.S.
 Mr. Nip Tak-kuen, Patrick, G.B.S.
 Mr. Sit Wing-hang, Alfred, G.B.S.
 Mr. Peh Yun-lu, Simon, G.B.S., S.B.S., I.D.S.M.
 Mr. Chu Nai-cheung, John, G.B.S.
 The Honourable Lee Wai-king, Starry, G.B.S., S.B.S., J.P.
 Mr. Tang Yun-kwong, Roy, G.B.S., J.P.
 Ms. Choi Suk-han, Annie, G.B.S., J.P.
 Dr. Lam Tai-fai, G.B.S., S.B.S., J.P.
 Mr. Cheung Wah-fung, Christopher, G.B.S., S.B.S., J.P.
 Professor Leung Wing-cheung, William, G.B.S., S.B.S., J.P.
 Mr. Hui Chung-shing, Herman, G.B.S., M.H., J.P.
 Mr. Chan Ka-kui, G.B.S., S.B.S., J.P.
 Mr. Lam Tin-fuk, Frederick, G.B.S., J.P.
 Dr. Auyeung Pak-kuen, Rex, G.B.S., J.P.
 Dr. Wang Ming-chun, Elizabeth, G.B.S., S.B.S.

References

External links

See also 
 Silver Bauhinia Star
 Bronze Bauhinia Star

Orders, decorations, and medals of Hong Kong
Lists of Hong Kong people
Awards established in 1997